Bettye Davis East Anchorage High School (BDEAHS) is a public high school which serves grades 9–12 in Anchorage, Alaska, United States. It is part of the Anchorage School District. The current principal is Ron Brown. East's mascot is the Thunderbird, and the school colors are red and blue. With an enrollment of 1,765 students as of the 2019–2020 school year, East High School is the second largest school in Alaska, after West Anchorage High School, which enrolled 1,772 students in the same school year. In October 2020, it was decided by the Anchorage School District Board to rename East Anchorage High School as Bettye Davis East Anchorage High School after the late Bettye Davis.

Notable alumni

 Scott Gomez (ca. 1997), former National Hockey League player who was also an assistant coach for the New York Islanders
 Trajan Langdon (1994), former professional basketball player who spent three seasons with the NBA's Cleveland Cavaliers
 Sean Parnell (1980), former Governor of Alaska
 Kikkan Randall (2001), Olympic skier
 Lora Reinbold (1982), Alaska politician
 James Dale Ritchie (1994), serial killer
 John Roderick (ca. 1986), musician
 Mao Tosi (1994), football player, Arizona Cardinals (ca. 2000)

References

External links
 School website

High schools in Anchorage, Alaska
Public high schools in Alaska
Educational institutions established in 1954
1954 establishments in Alaska